James Munro McPherson (born October 11, 1936) is an American Civil War historian and is the George Henry Davis '86 Professor Emeritus of United States History at Princeton University. He received the 1989 Pulitzer Prize for Battle Cry of Freedom: The Civil War Era. McPherson was the president of the American Historical Association in 2003.

Early life and education
Born in Valley City, North Dakota, McPherson graduated from St. Peter High School, and he received his Bachelor of Arts at Gustavus Adolphus College (St. Peter, Minnesota) in 1958 (from which he graduated magna cum laude), and his Ph.D. at Johns Hopkins University in 1963 where he studied under C. Vann Woodward.

Career

McPherson joined the faculty of Princeton in 1962. His works include The Struggle for Equality, awarded the Anisfield-Wolf Award in 1965. In 1988, he published his Pulitzer-winning book, Battle Cry of Freedom.  His 1990 book, Abraham Lincoln and the Second American Revolution argues that the emancipation of slaves amounts to a second American Revolution.  McPherson's 1998 book, For Cause and Comrades: Why Men Fought in the Civil War, received the Lincoln Prize. In 2002, he published both a scholarly book, Crossroads of Freedom: Antietam 1862, and a history of the American Civil War for children, Fields of Fury.

McPherson published This Mighty Scourge in 2007, a series of essays about the American Civil War. One essay describes the huge difficulty of negotiation when regime change is a war aim on either side of a conflict. "For at least the past two centuries, nations have usually found it harder to end a war than to start one. Americans learned that bitter lesson in Vietnam, and apparently having forgotten it, we're forced to learn it all over again in Iraq." One of McPherson's examples is the American Civil War, in which both the Union and the Confederacy sought regime change. It took four years to end the war.

McPherson was elected to the American Philosophical Society in 1991. In 1995, he received the Golden Plate Award of the American Academy of Achievement presented by Awards Council member David McCullough. 

McPherson was named the 2000 Jefferson Lecturer in the humanities by the National Endowment for the Humanities.  In making the announcement of McPherson's selection, NEH Chairman William R. Ferris said:

James M. McPherson has helped millions of Americans better understand the meaning and legacy of the American Civil War. By establishing the highest standards for scholarship and public education about the Civil War and by providing leadership in the movement to protect the nation's battlefields, he has made an exceptional contribution to historical awareness in America.

In 2002, McPherson received The Lincoln Forum's Richard Nelson Current Award of Achievement.
In 2007, he was awarded the $100,000 Pritzker Military Library Literature Award for lifetime achievement in military history and was the first recipient of the prize. In 2007, he was awarded the Samuel Eliot Morison Prize for lifetime achievement in military history given by the Society for Military History. He was elected a Fellow of the American Academy of Arts and Sciences in 2009.

In 2009, he was the co-winner of the Lincoln Prize for Tried by War: Abraham Lincoln as Commander in Chief.

Personal life
McPherson is married and has one child.

Activism
McPherson is known for his outspokenness on contemporary issues and for his activism, such as his work on behalf of the preservation of Civil War battlefields. As president in 1993–1994 of Protect Historic America, he lobbied against the construction of a Disney theme park near Manassas battlefield. He has also served on the boards of the Civil War Trust as well as the Association for the Preservation of Civil War Sites, a predecessor to the Civil War Trust. From 1990 to 1993, he sat on the Civil War Sites Advisory Commission.

Along with several other historians, McPherson signed a May 2009 petition asking U.S. President Barack Obama not to lay a wreath at the Confederate Monument Memorial at Arlington National Cemetery. The petition stated:

President Obama himself never addressed the issue. Instead, he sent a wreath not only to the Confederate Memorial but also instituted a new tradition of sending a presidential wreath to the African American Civil War Memorial in Washington, D.C. He also won the praise of the Sons of Confederate Veterans.

Filmography

See also

List of publications by James M. McPherson

References

Further reading

External links

Barnes & Noble - Meet the Writers
Princeton University Biography
George W. Bush and the Confederacy: Where Does He Stand?, Democracy Now November 3, 1999
Presentation on the Civil War
A Conversation with James McPherson Interview at the Pritzker Military Museum & Library from October 5, 2007
Lifetime Literature Award Announcement at the Pritzker Military Museum & Library
Audio interview with National Review Online
Interview by Kim Nagy, Wild River Review
McPherson archive from The New York Review of Books
James M. McPherson No Peace without Victory, 1861–1865, AHA Presidential Address  Retrieved April 18, 2010 

Interview with McPherson on What They Fought For, 1861–1865, Booknotes May 22, 1994
Interview with McPherson, In Depth March 4, 2001
 "Tried by War: Abraham Lincoln as Commander in Chief" Lecture at the Pritzker Military Museum & Library on March 13, 2008
 "150 Years After the Emancipation Proclamation" Discussion at the Pritzker Military Museum & Library on September 28, 2012

1936 births
20th-century American historians
20th-century American male writers
21st-century American historians
21st-century American male writers
American male non-fiction writers
Fellows of the American Academy of Arts and Sciences
Gustavus Adolphus College alumni
Historians of Abraham Lincoln
Historians of the American Civil War
Historians of the United States
Johns Hopkins University alumni
Living people
MacArthur Fellows
Members of the American Philosophical Society
People from Valley City, North Dakota
Presidents of the American Historical Association
Princeton University faculty
Pulitzer Prize for History winners
Lincoln Prize winners
Writers from New Jersey
Writers from North Dakota